is a junction passenger railway station located in the city of Kodaira, Tokyo, Japan, operated by the private railway operator Seibu Railway.

Lines
It is located 22.6 kilometers from the terminus of the line at Seibu-Shinjuku.

Station layout
The station has two island platforms serving four tracks, with an elevated station building located above the platforms and tracks.

Platforms

History
The station opened on April 16, 1927.

Station numbering was introduced on all Seibu Railway lines during fiscal 2012, with Kodaira Station becoming "SS19".

Passenger statistics
In fiscal 2019, the station was the 25th busiest on the Seibu network with an average of 38,780 passengers daily. 

The passenger figures for previous years are as shown below.

Surrounding area
Kodaira Station has South and North exits. Near the South Exit are the Kodaira Seiyu department store, a public building named Rune, a high school run by the government of Tokyo, and, about 1.75 km away, Shin-Kodaira Station on the JR Musashino Line. The North Exit is convenient for the Kodaira Metropolitan Cemetery.

See also
List of railway stations in Japan

References

External links

 Kodaira Station information (Seibu Railway) 

Railway stations in Tokyo
Stations of Seibu Railway
Railway stations in Japan opened in 1927
Seibu Shinjuku Line
Seibu Haijima Line
Kodaira, Tokyo